Yeongtong-gu, established in 2003, is the eastern district of the city of Suwon in Gyeonggi-do, South Korea.  It is split from Paldal-gu and Suwon's newest "gu".

Administrative divisions
Yeongtong Gu is divided into the following "dong"s.
Maetan-dong (매탄동) (divided in turn into Maetan 1 to 4 Dong)
Taejang-dong (태장동) (divided in turn into Mangpo-dong and Sin-dong)
Woncheon-dong (원천동) (divided in turn into Woncheon-dong)
Yeongtong-dong (영통동) (divided in turn into Yeongtong 1 and 2 Dong)
Gwanggyo 1-dong (광교1동) (Legal Dong into Iui-dong)
Gwanggyo 2-dong (광교2동) (Legal Dong into Ha-dong)

See also
Suwon
Gwonseon-gu
Jangan-gu
Paldal-gu

External links
 Suwon City government website 
 
 Yeongtong-gu  website 

Districts of Suwon